CSA Treichville is an Ivorian basketball club based in the Treichville neighbourhood in Abidjan. Established in 1998, the team plays in the Ivorian Basketball Championship, the national highest level league. CSA has won the national championship four times.

Honours
Ivorian Basketball Championship
Champions (4): 2009, 2010, 2012, 2016
Ivorian National Cup
Champions (5): 2006, 2007, 2008, 2009, 2010

References

External links
Official website (in French)
Afrobasket profile

Basketball teams in Ivory Coast
Basketball teams established in 1998